OFK Remont 1959 is a football club based in Čačak, Serbia. They compete in the Čačak City League, the sixth tier of the national league system.

History
The club was founded on 21 May 1959. They participated in the Second League of Serbia and Montenegro between 2001 and 2003. In 2006, the club was relegated from the Serbian League West for the second time in three seasons.

In 2020, the club was refounded as OFK Remont 1959.

Honours
Moravica Zone League (Tier 4)
 2004–05

Notable players
This is a list of players who have played at full international level.
  Đorđe Kamber
  Miloš Marić
For a list of all FK Remont Čačak players with a Wikipedia article, see :Category:FK Remont Čačak players.

References

External links
 Club page at Srbijasport

 
1959 establishments in Yugoslavia
2020 establishments in Serbia
Association football clubs established in 1959
Association football clubs established in 2020
Football clubs in Serbia
Sport in Čačak